Kang Yong (Hangul: 강용; Hanja: 康甬; born January 14, 1979) is a South Korean football player who since 2008 has played for Chunnam Dragons. He formerly played for Pohang Steelers and Gwangju Sangmu Bulsajo.

From 2009, he was loaned to Gangwon FC for one year. In July 2011, he joined Daegu FC.

Honours

Club 
Pohang Steelers
 K-League
 Runner-up (1) : 2004
 Korean FA Cup
 Runner-up (2) : 2001, 2002

Club career statistics

References

External links
 

1979 births
Living people
South Korean footballers
Pohang Steelers players
Jeonnam Dragons players
Gimcheon Sangmu FC players
Gangwon FC players
Daegu FC players
K League 1 players
Association football defenders